The Kerguelen Plateau, also known as the Kerguelen–Heard Plateau, is an oceanic plateau and a large igneous province (LIP) located on the Antarctic Plate, in the southern Indian Ocean.

The plateau was produced by the Kerguelen hotspot, starting with or following the breakup of Gondwana about 130 million years ago. A small portion of the plateau breaks sea level, forming the Kerguelen Islands (a French overseas territory) plus the Heard and McDonald Islands (an Australian external territory). Intermittent volcanism continues on the Heard and McDonald Islands.

Geographical extent

Symmetrically across the Indian Ocean ridge and due west of Australia is the Broken Ridge underwater volcanic plateau, which at one time was contiguous with the Kerguelen Plateau before rifting by the mid-ocean ridge.

To the north of Broken Ridge is the linear Ninety East Ridge which continues almost due north into the Bay of Bengal and is considered to be a hotspot track.

Located on the Antarctic Plate, the Kerguelen Plateau is separated from Australia by the Southeast Indian Ridge (SEIR) and from Africa by the Southwest Indian Ridge (SWIR). These two ridges meet at the Rodriguez Triple Junction. It is separated from Antarctica by Princess Elizabeth Trough and the Cooperation Sea. The eastern margin north of the William Ridge is steep and formed during the breakup between the Kerguelen Plateau and the Broken Ridge. The southern part of the margin is separated from the Australian–Antarctic Basin by the deep Labuan Basin.

Geological history
From the initial opening of the Indian Ocean until present, the Kerguelen hotspot has produced several now widely dispersed large-scale structures.

India–Australia breakup

The oldest volcanism that can be attributed to the Kerguelen plume are the Bunbury Basalt (137–130.5 ) and Naturaliste Plateau (132–128 ) in southwestern Australia, and the Rajmahal Traps in eastern India (118 ). The formation of the oldest portion of the Kerguelen LIP and these continental basalts are linked to the opening of the eastern Indian Ocean. The Bunbury Basalt is not of flood basalt dimensions which suggests that the mantle underlying the newly formed Kerguelen hotspot was neither significantly hot, wet, or voluminous. In contrast, the magmatism that produced the Australia–India breakup 136–158  created the Wallaby Plateau, but no known hotspot has been linked to this event.

India–Antarctica breakup
The output from the Kerguelen hotspot peaked 120–95 , 12–70  after the India–Antarctica breakup. No ridges or hotspot tracks such as Walvis–Rio Grande, Chagos–Laccadive, Greenland–Scotland have been found in the Princess Elizabeth Trough between SKP and Antarctica or along India's conjugate eastern continental margin. The relation between the Kerguelen hotspot and these continental breakup and volcanic margins is instead similar to that between the Réunion hotspot and the Deccan Traps and the breakup between western India and the Seychelles.

The peak output of the Kerguelen hotspot coincides with one or several microcontinent formations, such as the Elan Bank. Since the Indian Ocean began to open about 130 , the Kerguelen hotspot has moved 3–10° southward and, consequently, the spreading ridge between India and Antarctica has jumped northward one or several times. Parts of the Kerguelen Plateau, the Elan Bank and the SKP, were originally attached to India and are composed of continental lithosphere. One or several ridge jumps transformed the Elan Bank into a microcontinent and dispersed continental fragments in the SKP, and these structures were eventually left behind as India moved northward. The ridge jump that made the Elan Bank a microcontinent occurred after 124 . The development of the Southern Kerguelen Plateau 118–119  contributed to the oceanic anoxic event 1.

Around 83.5  sea floor spreading between India and Antarctica was asymmetric in the Kerguelen Plateau region with two-thirds of the sea floor created being added to the Antarctic Plate. A ridge jump eventually transferred parts of the Kerguelen Plateau from the Indian Plate to the Antarctic Plate.

Cenozoic volcanism
The lack of a conjugate structure on the Antarctic Plate, however, makes it unlikely that the hotspot was located at a spreading ridge during this long period. As the Antarctic Plate then moved over the Kerguelen hotspot the NKP formed over relatively old oceanic crust. Flood basalts in the Kerguelen archipelago formed 30–24  and less voluminous and more recent volcanism occurred until 1 . During the last 21  volcanic structures have formed on the CKP, including Heard Island, and both Heard and McDonald Islands have had recent eruptions.

65 , the CKP–Broken Ridge LIP was located near the Kerguelen plume and the plate boundaries of the Indian Ocean. The LIP was the product of 25  of relatively high magmatic activity followed by a 40  period of lower activity.

Microcontinent
 described tilted basement blocks near the Kerguelen Archipelago and were the first to identify the Kerguelen Plateau as of continental origin, in contrast to other LIPs.

The presence of soil layers in the basalt which included charcoal and conglomerate fragments of gneiss indicate that much of the plateau was above sea level as what is termed a microcontinent for three periods between 100 million years ago and 20 million years ago (the charcoal was made by wildfires started by lightning or lava flows). Large parts of the now-submarine Southern Kerguelen Plateaus (SKP) and Central Kerguelen Plateaus (CKP) were subaerial during the formation of the LIP.

The Kerguelen Microcontinent may have been covered by dense conifer forest in the mid-Cretaceous. The plateau had been proposed as forming a land bridge between India and Antarctica during the Late Cretaceous, though this is now considered unsupported, with the plateau situated considerable distance from the nearest continents.

Biodiversity
During the austral summer there is a high density of migratory whales including sperm, minke, and humpback whales along the southern end of the Kerguelen Plateau and the northern part of the adjacent Princess Elizabeth Trough. These whales choose this location for foraging because the Southern Front of the Antarctic Circumpolar Current is steered off by the Plateau—resulting in a poleward extent for the Southern Front only found near the Kerguelen Plateau. This brings shoaled, nutrient-rich Upper Circumpolar Deep Water to the surface which brings macronutrients to the surface. Ice is additionally advected north along the eastern side of the plateau.

See also

References

Notes

Sources

 
 
 
 
 
 
 
 
 
 
 

Large igneous provinces
Plateaus of the Indian Ocean
Historical continents
Landforms of the Kerguelen Islands
Continental fragments
Cretaceous volcanism
Volcanism of the Indian Ocean
Landforms of Heard Island and McDonald Islands